Ichthyotringa is an extinct genus of alepisauriform fish from Cretaceous-aged marine strata of Lebanon, Africa, Italy, and North America.  Ichthyotringa are characterized by a slender, highly elongated beak that accounts for a third of the fish's length.

References
 Alepisauriformes

Prehistoric aulopiformes
Prehistoric ray-finned fish genera
Late Cretaceous fish of Asia